Roann Historic District is a national historic district located at Roann and Paw Paw Township, Wabash County, Indiana. It encompasses 117 contributing buildings, 2 contributing sites, and 1 contributing structure in the central business district and surrounding residential sections of Roann.  It developed between about 1853 and 1961, and includes representative examples of Gothic Revival, Italianate, Queen Anne, Second Empire, Colonial Revival, and Streamline Moderne style architecture. Located in the district are the separately listed Roann Covered Bridge, Roann-Paw Paw Township Public Library, and Thomas J. Lewis House.  Other notable buildings include the First Brethren Church (1891), Dersham House and Veterinary Clinic (c. 1885), Roann Christian Church (1961), Watson House (c. 1940), Universalist Church (1875), Roann Methodist Church (1898), Paw Paw Township School (1941), James Van Buskirk House (c. 1873), Halderman Building (c. 1885), U.S. Post Office and Medical Building (1958), Nicely Oil Service Station (1938), Comer Building (1920), and Spiece House (c. 1885).

It was listed on the National Register of Historic Places in 2013.

References

Historic districts on the National Register of Historic Places in Indiana
Gothic Revival architecture in Indiana
Italianate architecture in Indiana
Colonial Revival architecture in Indiana
Queen Anne architecture in Indiana
Second Empire architecture in Indiana
Historic districts in Wabash County, Indiana
National Register of Historic Places in Wabash County, Indiana